Fair Island, also called Vere Island, is a former community on the northeast coast of the island of Newfoundland. Together with other nearby communities it comprises an area called Bonavista North. These communities have a shared history in that they were settled by people from England, predominantly from the West Country - Dorset, Devon Somerset and Hampshire.

Geography
On the northeast coast of Newfoundland in Bonavista Bay, just east of Centreville, lie a group of islands close to the shore line called Fair Islands. The dome-shaped islands are separated by a narrow channel called the Fair Island Tickle. Fair Islands was once a popular settlement because its harbours were excellent for schooners, it was near the seal migration routes, and it was a good fishing base because of its offshore location and ample fresh water. However, Fair Island was vacated by the 1960s.

History
Fair Islands, originally called Vere Island, was one of the earliest fishing bases in Bonavista Bay; in the summer of 1681 there was a population of 16 recorded there and they were fishing from three boats. Beginning in the early 19th century, there was an increase in English settlement, and by 1806 there were two fishing rooms built in Fair Island by English men. The earliest settlers came from Devon, Cornwall, and Liverpool, England. It is believed that Richard Rogers from Sheffield, England settled in Fair Island around 1800 and other families soon followed. Families that moved there between 1800 and 1840 were: Ackerman, Gibbons, Pond, Way, Wicks, and later came, Harlock, Farmage,Oakley & Boland 

The population doubled between 1836 and 1869 from 105 to 212 settlers and they turned more towards the Labrador fishery as the inshore fishery could no longer sustain the growing population. Sealing activity was first recorded in 1857, the Labrador cod fishery was still growing, and smaller quantities of salmon, herring, and capelin were also being caught.  By 1891 there was also a lobster factory recorded which employed 31 men.

The economy was based on the Labrador fishery until its decline in 1930s and 40s. By 1952 there were only 8 families engaged in fishing for cod, lobster, and turbot. In the winter men were employed with woods work, but by the 1950s most families were being resettled elsewhere. Fair Islands were vacated by the 1960s.

Church History
On September 7, 1846 Bishop Edward Feild, sailed to Fair Island and consecrated St. Barnabas Church. He was the first bishop to visit since Bishop Inglis' visit in the 1830s.

Education History
A school was first reported in 1836, established by the Newfoundland School Society. The first teacher was Moses Cutler and the initial enrolment was 28 students.

Census Information

Directories
- Hutchinson's Directory of 1864 lists one person under Fair Island:
 William Pickett, Sr. - Planter

- Lovell's Directory describes Fair Island as an island on the west side of Bonavista Bay, distant from Greenspond by 9 miles by boat with a population of 212. The names that are listed are:
Ackerman, Stephen - Fisherman
Ansty, John - Planter
Bollen, Isaac - Fisherman
Brown, James - Fisherman
Cutler, John - Planter
Farmage, Samuel - Fisherman
Gibbons, John - Fisherman
Harlock, Thomas - Fisherman
Hounsell, George - Fisherman
Hunt, Anthony - Fisherman
Hunt, Robert - Fisherman
Noble, William - Fisherman
Oakley, Charles
Picket, John - Fisherman
Picket, Jonah - Fisherman
Picket, William - Planter
Pond, Edward - Fisherman
Rogers, Charles - Fisherman
Rogers, John - Fisherman
Rogers, John, jun - Planter
Way, John - Fisherman
Wieks, Benjamin - Fisherman

Interesting facts
Native Newfoundland actor, Andre Noble, 25, died on the island on July 30, 2004 from accidental monkshood poisoning.
 members of the outport road board for Fair Island: Brown, Hunt, Rodgers, and Filthorn.
There were 2 fishing rooms in Fair Island were recorded in 1805: Pickett's Room and Lane's Room.

See also
 List of ghost towns in Newfoundland and Labrador

References

External links
 For photos of Fair Island, more information on Fair Island, and to view Fair Island on a map, visit:
 http://www.willow-house.com/gazfree/Bonavista.html
 https://www.mun.ca/mha/resettlement/fair_island_1.php
 http://ngb.chebucto.org/
 http://www.ucs.mun.ca/~hrollman/index.html
http://www.rootsweb.com/~cannf/bbnor.htm

Research on this page has been contributed by the Greenspond Historical Society. Please assist us in getting the history of Bonavista North online for all to access.

Ghost towns in Newfoundland and Labrador